An Answer from the Silence: A Story from the Mountains is a 1937 novel by the Swiss writer Max Frisch. It tells the story of a young man who escapes to the Swiss Alps ten days before his wedding.

Reception
The book was reviewed in Publishers Weekly in 2011: "Infused with a post-WWI despair at the human condition, Frisch (1911-1991) refused this early piece's inclusion in his collected works in the 1970s, having burned the original manuscript in the woods in 1937. It seems a pity that this earnest and unusual book, in a crisp translation by Mitchell, has been denied us until now."

See also
 1937 in literature
 Swiss literature

References

1937 German-language novels
Novels by Max Frisch
Swiss novels
1937 debut novels